Michael Davis is a retired American weightlifter. Competing in the −100 kg division he won a gold medal at the 1983 Pan American Games.

References

Living people
American male weightlifters
Pan American Games medalists in weightlifting
Pan American Games gold medalists for the United States
Year of birth missing (living people)
Medalists at the 1983 Pan American Games
Weightlifters at the 1983 Pan American Games